Mirus is a genus of air-breathing land snails, terrestrial pulmonate gastropod mollusks in the subfamily Eninae of the family Enidae.

Species

 Mirus acuminatus (Möllendorff, 1901)
 Mirus alboreflexus (Ancey, 1882)
 Mirus andersonianus (Möllendorff, 1885)
 Mirus antisecalinus (Heude, 1890)
 Mirus armandi (Ancey, 1882)
 Mirus aubryanus (Heude, 1885)
 Mirus avenaceus (Heude, 1885)
 Mirus brachystoma (Heude, 1882)
 Mirus brizoides (Möllendorff, 1901)
 Mirus cantorii (Philippi, 1844)
 Mirus chalcedonicus (Gredler, 1887)
 Mirus daucopsis (Heude, 1888)
 Mirus davidi (Deshayes, 1870)
 Mirus derivatus (Deshayes, 1874)
 † Mirus euonymus (Sturany, 1899) 
 Mirus fargesianus (Heude, 1885)
 Mirus franzhuberi Thach, 2020
 Mirus frinianus (Heude, 1885)
 Mirus funiculus (Heude, 1882)
 Mirus gracilispirus Kajiyama & Habe, 1961
 Mirus gracilispirus (Möllendorff, 1901)
 Mirus hanleyanus (Kobelt, 1902)
 Mirus hartmanni (Ancey, 1888)
 Mirus interstratus (Sturany, 1899)
 Mirus japonicus (Möllendorff, 1885)
 Mirus junensis O.-K. Kwon & J.-S. Lee, 1991
 Mirus krejcii (Haas, 1933)
 Mirus meronianus (Heude, 1890)
 Mirus minutus (Heude, 1882)
 Mirus moupiniensis (Deshayes, 1870)
 Mirus murotonis (Kuroda & Habe, 1945)
 Mirus nilagiricus (L. Pfeiffer, 1846)
 Mirus nothus (Pilsbry, 1934)
 Mirus obongensis J.-S. Lee & D.-K. Min, 2018
 Mirus panos (Benson, 1853)
 Mirus praelongus (Ancey, 1882)
 Mirus proletaria (L. Pfeiffer, 1855)
 Mirus pyrinus (Möllendorff, 1901)
 Mirus reinianus (Kobelt, 1875)
 Mirus rugulosus (Möllendorff, 1900)
 Mirus saccatus (Möllendorff, 1902)
 Mirus siehoensis (Hilber, 1883)
 Mirus smithei (Benson, 1865)
 Mirus stalix (Benson, 1863)
 Mirus transiens (Ancey, 1888)
 Mirus ultriculus (Heude, 1882)
 Mirus utriculus (Heude, 1882)
 Mirus vicarius (W. T. Blanford, 1870)

Taxon inquirendum
 † Mirus funiculoides (Hsü, 1936) 
Species brought into synonymy
 Mirus albescens (Möllendorff, 1884): synonym of Apoecus albescens (Möllendorff, 1884) (unaccepted combination)
 Mirus cantori (Philippi, 1844): synonym of Mirus cantorii (Philippi, 1844) (incorrect subsequent spelling)
 Mirus ceratinus (Benson, 1849): synonym of Nepaliena ceratina (Benson, 1849)
 Mirus granulatus (Möllendorff, 1884): synonym of Apoecus granulatus (Möllendorff, 1884) (superseded combination)
 Mirus hartmanni (Ancey, 1888): synonym of Mirus hartmani (Ancey, 1888) (incorrect subsequent spelling)
 Mirus huberi Thach, 2018: synonym of Apoecus macrostoma (Bavay & Dautzenberg, 1912) (junior synonym)
 Mirus mupingianus (Deshayes, 1870): synonym of Mirus moupiniensis (Deshayes, 1870) (misspelling of specific epithet)
 Mirus trivialis (Ancey, 1888): synonym of Apoecus trivialis (Ancey, 1888) (unaccepted combination)

References

 Bank, R. A. (2017). Classification of the Recent terrestrial Gastropoda of the World. Last update: July 16, 2017

External links

 Albers, J. C. (1850). Die Heliceen nach natürlicher Verwandtschaft systematisch geordnet. Berlin: Enslin. 262 pp

Enidae